Lazybones is a 1935 British film directed by Michael Powell. It was made as a Quota quickie.

Plot
Sir Reginald Ford (Ian Hunter), known as "Lazybones", is an idle baronet. He hasn't a care in the world, although he doesn't have any money either. His brother and sister introduce him to Kitty McCarthy (Claire Luce), an American heiress, in the hope that he'll marry her and so gain access to her fortune which will help out his family.

Kitty's cousin Mike (Bernard Nedell) brings Kitty the bad news that she's lost her fortune. Mike is hoping to grab the maps for some Arabian oil fields that are being kept in the house. They are being guarded by two detectives and everybody chasing everybody else whilst trying to get the plans makes an amusing sub-plot.

Back in the main story line, Reginald has discovered that he loves Kitty for herself and doesn't care about her not having a fortune. So they get married, despite the warnings from a pessimistic passer-by who they call in as a witness. Neither of them are broke, but it takes a lot to run the old family pile. Kitty has bought a pub and Reginald  and Kitty have some fun serving the regulars there.

Back at the family seat Reginald has found a way to make money from other idle members of the English aristocracy. He sets up a "Home for the Idle Wealthy" and they come to stay (for a fee) and act as butler, gardener, chauffeur etc.

Cast
Claire Luce as Kitty McCarthy
Ian Hunter as Sir Reginald Ford
Sara Allgood as Bridget
Bernard Nedell as Mike McCarthy
Michael Shepley as Hildebrand Pope
Bobbie Comber as Kemp
Denys Blakelock as Hugh Ford
Mary Gaskell as Marjory Ford
Pamela Carne as Lottie Pope
Harold Warrender as Lord Melton
Miles Malleson as Pessimist
Fred Withers as Richards
Frank Morgan as Tom
Fewlass Llewellyn as Lord Brockley
Paul Blake as Viscount Woodland

Production
This was made at a time when the studios used to work through the night. The leading actors were both in plays in London, and so after their evening performance they would come out to Twickenham to shoot their parts.

Notes

External links

Lazybones reviews and articles at the Powell & Pressburger Pages

1935 films
Films directed by Michael Powell
Films by Powell and Pressburger
British black-and-white films
British comedy films
1935 comedy films
1930s English-language films
1930s British films